Skyhaven Airport  is a public-use airport located three miles (5 km) northwest of the central business district of Warrensburg, a city in Johnson County, Missouri, United States. It is owned by the University of Central Missouri.

Although most U.S. airports use the same three-letter location identifier for the FAA and IATA, Skyhaven Airport is assigned RCM by the FAA but has no designation from the IATA (which assigned RCM to Richmond Airport in Richmond, Queensland, Australia).

Facilities and aircraft 

For the 12-month period ending June 30, 2011, the airport had 74,325 aircraft operations, an average of 203 per day: 99.6% general aviation, 0.4% air taxi and <0.1% military. At that time there were 54 aircraft based at this airport: 88% single-engine, 5% multi-engine and 7% glider.

References

External links 

Airports in Missouri
Buildings and structures in Johnson County, Missouri
University of Central Missouri
University and college airports